The following outline is provided as an overview of and topical guide to ancient Rome:

Ancient Rome – former civilization that thrived on the Italian Peninsula as early as the 8th century BC. Located along the Mediterranean Sea and centered on the city of Rome, it expanded to become one of the largest empires in the ancient world.

Essence of Ancient Rome 

 Civilization
 Classical antiquity
 Ancient Rome
 Greco-Roman world

Geography of ancient Rome 

 Roman provinces
 Achaia
 Africa
 Alpes Graiae et Poeninae
 Arabia Petraea
 Arcadia Aegypti
 Asia
 Assyria
 Bithynia and Pontus
 Britannia
 Byzacena
 Cappadocia
 Cilicia
 Coele Syria
 Crete and Cyrenaica
 Cyprus
 Dacia
 Dacia Aureliana
 Dalmatia
 Danubian provinces
 Dardania
 Egypt
 Galatia
 Gallia Aquitania
 Gallia Belgica
 Gallia Lugdunensis
 Gallia Narbonensis
 Gaul
 Germania Antiqua
 Germania Inferior
 Germania Superior
 Hispania Baetica
 Hispania Balearica
 Hispania Carthaginensis
 Hispania Citerior
 Hispania Tarraconensis
 Illyricum
 Islands
 Judea
 Lycia et Pamphylia
 Lusitania
 Macedonia
 Mauretania Caesariensis
 Mauretania Tingitana
 Mesopotamia
 Moesia
 Numidia
 Pannonia Inferior
 Pannonia Prima
 Pannonia Savia
 Pannonia Secunda
 Pannonia Superior
 Pannonia Valeria
 Raetia
 Sardinia and Corsica
 Sicilia
 Syria
 Tres Alpes
Alpes Cottiae
Alpes Graiae et Poeninae
Alpes Maritimae

 Cities founded by the Romans
 Climate of ancient Rome
 Demography of the Roman Empire
 Roman geographers
 Topography of ancient Rome
 Lexicon Topographicum Urbis Romae (1993–2000)

Government and politics of ancient Rome 

 Curia
 Forum
 Cursus honorum
 Collegiality
 Emperor
 Legatus
 Dux
 Officium
 Praefectus
 Princeps senatus
 Populares
 Vicarius
 Vigintisexviri
 Lictor
 Magister militum
 Imperator
 Pontifex maximus
 Augustus
 Caesar
 SPQR
 Tetrarch

Political institutions of ancient Rome 

Political institutions of ancient Rome
 of ancient Rome in general
 Roman Senate
 Roman assemblies
 Curiate Assembly
 Centuriate Assembly
 Tribal Assembly
 Plebeian Council
 Executive magistrates
 of the Roman Kingdom
 Senate of the Roman Kingdom
 Legislative Assemblies of the Roman Kingdom
 Executive magistrates of the Roman Kingdom
 of the Roman Republic
 Senate of the Roman Republic
 Legislative Assemblies of the Roman Republic
 Executive magistrates of the Roman Republic
 of the Roman Empire
 Senate of the Roman Empire
 Legislative Assemblies of the Roman Empire
 Executive magistrates of the Roman Empire

Magistrates 

Roman magistrate

Ordinary magistrates 

Ordinary magistrate
 Tribune
 Quaestor
 Aedile
 Praetor
 Consul
 Censor
 Promagistrate
 Governor

Extraordinary magistrates 

Extraordinary magistrate
 Dictator
 Master of the Horse
 Decemviri
 Consular tribune
 Triumvir
 Rex
 Interrex

Roman law 

Roman law
 Constitution (Roman law)
 Roman laws
 Twelve Tables
 Roman citizenship
 Auctoritas
 Imperium
 Status in Roman legal system
 Roman litigation
 Roman Constitution
 History of the Roman Constitution
 Constitution of the Roman Kingdom
  History of the Constitution of the Roman Kingdom
 Constitution of the Roman Republic
 History of the Constitution of the Roman Republic
 Constitutional reforms of Sulla
 Constitutional reforms of Julius Caesar
 Constitution of the Roman Empire
 History of the Constitution of the Roman Empire
 Constitution of the Late Roman Empire
 History of the Constitution of the Late Roman Empire (post Diocletian)

Military of ancient Rome 

Military of ancient Rome
 Roman generals
 Weapons
 Ballista
 Battering ram
 Catapulta
 Gladius
 Onager
 Pilum
 Scorpio
 Siege tower
 Spatha
 Roman military diploma
 Honesta missio
 Praetorian Guard
 Victory titles

Roman armed forces 
 Roman army
 Early Roman army
 Roman army of the mid-Republic
 Roman army of the late Republic
 Imperial Roman army
 Late Roman army
 East Roman army
 Size of the Roman army
 Troops
 Alae
 Cohorts
Auxiliaries
Alpine regiments of the Roman army
Cavalry
Turmae
 Centuriae
 Contubernia
 Legions
Vexillationes
Limitanei
Numeri
 Maniples
 Palatini
 Roman infantry tactics
Testudo formation
 Military equipment
 Roman military personal equipment
 Roman siege engines
 Navy
 Fleet
 Decorations and punishments
Roman triumph
Ovation
 Decimatio
 Fustuarium
 Economics of the Roman army
 Roman military clothing

Military history of Rome 

Military history of ancient Rome
 Borders of the Roman Empire
 Roman military frontiers and fortifications
 Castra
 Military engineering of ancient Rome
 Military establishment of the Roman kingdom
 Military establishment of the Roman Republic
 Political history of the Roman military
 Strategy of the Roman military
 Structural history of the Roman military
 Technological history of the Roman military

Military conflict 

 Campaign history of the Roman military
 Roman wars
 Roman battles
 Battle of Cannae
 Battle of Cape Ecnomus
 Battle of Actium

General history of ancient Rome 

Roman era
 History of Rome
 Founding of Rome
Kingdom of Rome
Kings of Rome
Roman Republic
Conflict of the Orders (494-287 BC)
Punic Wars (264-146 BC) – series of three wars fought between Rome and ancient Carthage
 First Punic War (264-241 BC)
 Ebro Treaty
 Second Punic War (218-201 BC) – marked by Hannibal's surprising overland journey and his costly crossing of the Alps, followed by his reinforcement by Gaulish allies and crushing victories over Roman armies in the battle of the Trebia and the giant ambush at Trasimene.
 Hannibal – Punic Carthaginian military commander, generally considered one of the greatest military commanders in history. Hannibal occupied much of Italy for 15 years, but a Roman counter-invasion of North Africa forced him to return to Carthage, where he was decisively defeated by Scipio Africanus at the Battle of Zama.
 Conquests of Hannibal
 Hannibal's Crossing of the Alps
 Battle of the Trebia
 Battle of Lake Trasimene
 Battle of Cannae
 Battle of Zama – marked the final and decisive end of the Second Punic War.  A Roman army led by Publius Cornelius Scipio Africanus defeated a Carthaginian force led by the legendary commander Hannibal. Soon after this defeat on their home ground, the Carthaginian senate sued for peace, which was given to them by the Roman Republic on rather humiliating terms, ending the 17-year war.
 Third Punic War (149-146 BC) – involved an extended siege of Carthage, ending in the city's thorough destruction. The resurgence of the struggle can be explained by growing anti-Roman agitations in Hispania and Greece, and the visible improvement of Carthaginian wealth and martial power in the fifty years since the Second Punic War.
 Siege of Carthage (c. 149 BC)
Crisis of the Roman Republic (134 BC-44 BC) – extended period of political instability and social unrest that culminated in the demise of the Roman Republic and the advent of the Roman Empire.
 Assassination of Julius Caesar
Roman Empire
 Principate (27 BC-284 AD) – first period of the Roman Empire, extending from the beginning of the reign of Caesar Augustus to the Crisis of the Third Century, after which it was replaced with the Dominate. During the Principate, the constitution of the Roman Republic was never formally abolished. It was amended in such a way as to maintain a politically correct façade of Republican government. This ended following the Crisis of the Third Century (235–284), during the reign of Diocletian.
 Julio-Claudian dynasty (27 BC-68 AD) – the first five Roman Emperors, including Augustus, Tiberius, Caligula (also known as Gaius), Claudius, and Nero. The dynasty ended when Nero committed suicide.
  Augustus
 Tiberius (ruled 14-37 AD) – stepson of Augustus. He was one of Rome's greatest generals, conquering Pannonia, Dalmatia, Raetia, and temporarily Germania; laying the foundations for the northern frontier. But he came to be remembered as a dark, reclusive, and sombre ruler who never really desired to be emperor; Pliny the Elder called him tristissimus hominum, "the gloomiest of men."
 Caligula
 Claudius
 Nero
 Year of the Four Emperors (69 AD) – these four emperors were Galba, Otho, Vitellius, and Vespasian. Vespasian's rule marked the beginning of the Flavian dynasty.
 Galba
 Otho
 Vitellius
 Vespasian
 Flavian dynasty (69-96 AD)
 Nerva–Antonine dynasty (96-192 AD) – dynasty of seven Roman Emperors who ruled over the Roman Empire from 96 AD to 192 AD. These Emperors were Nerva, Trajan, Hadrian, Antoninus Pius, Marcus Aurelius, Lucius Verus, and Commodus.
 Nerva
 Hadrian
 Antoninus Pius
 Marcus Aurelius
 Lucius Verus
 Commodus
 Severan dynasty (193-235 AD)
 Crisis of the Third Century (235-284 AD) – period in which the Roman Empire nearly collapsed under the combined pressures of invasion, civil war, plague, and economic depression. The Crisis began with the assassination of Emperor Alexander Severus at the hands of his own troops, initiating a fifty-year period in which 20–25 claimants to the title of Emperor, mostly prominent Roman army generals, assumed imperial power over all or part of the Empire.
 Barracks emperor – any Roman Emperor who seized power by virtue of his command of the army. Barracks emperors were especially common in the period from 235 through 284, during the Crisis of the Third Century.
 List of barracks emperors
Gallic Empire (260-274 AD) – modern name for a breakaway realm of the Roman Empire, founded by Postumus in 260 in the wake of barbarian invasions and instability in Rome, and at its height included the territories of Germania, Gaul, Britannia, and (briefly) Hispania.
Palmyrene Empire (260-273) – splinter empire, that broke away from the Roman Empire during the Crisis of the Third Century. It encompassed the Roman provinces of Syria Palaestina, Egypt and large parts of Asia Minor.
 Dominate (284-476 AD) – 'despotic' latter phase of government in the ancient Roman Empire from the conclusion of the Third Century Crisis until the collapse of the Western Empire. The Emperor Diocletian abandoned the appearances of the Republic for the sake of control, and introduced a novel system of joint rule by four monarchs known as the Tetrarchy.
 Decline of the Roman Empire – process spanning many centuries; there is no consensus when it might have begun but many dates and time lines have been proposed by historians.
 Tetrarchy (293-313 AD) – Diocletian designated the general Maximian as co-emperor, first as Caesar (junior emperor) in 285, and then promoted him to Augustus in 286. Diocletian took care of matters in the Eastern regions of the Empire while Maximian similarly took charge of the Western regions. In 293, feeling more focus was needed on both civic and military problems, Diocletian, with Maximian's consent, expanded the imperial college by appointing two Caesars (one responsible to each Augustus).  The tetrarchy collapsed, however, in 313 and a few years later Constantine I reunited the two administrative divisions of the Empire as sole Augustus.
 First Tetrarchy – created by Diocletian with Maximian's consent in 293 by the appointment of two subordinate Caesars.
 Diocletian (Augustus)
 Galerius  (Caesar)
 Maximian  (Augustus)
 Constantius Chlorus (Caesar)
 Second Tetrarchy – in 305, the senior emperors jointly abdicated and retired, elevating Constantius and Galerius to the rank of Augusti. They in turn appointed two new Caesars.
 Galerius  (Augustus)
 Maximinus (Caesar)
 Constantius Chlorus (Augustus)
 Flavius Valerius Severus (Caesar)
 Civil wars of the Tetrarchy – series of conflicts between the co-emperors of the Roman Empire, starting in 306 AD with the usurpation of Maxentius and the defeat of Severus, and ending with the defeat of Licinius at the hands of Constantine I in 324 AD.
 Constantinian dynasty –  informal name for the ruling family of the Roman Empire from Constantius Chlorus (†305) to the death of Julian in 363. It is named after its most famous member, Constantine the Great who became the sole ruler of the empire in 324. It is also called the Neo-Flavian dynasty.
 First phase of the Migration Period
  Division of the Roman Empire – in order to maintain control and improve administration, various schemes to divide the work of the Roman Emperor by sharing it between individuals were tried between 285 and 324, from 337 to 350, from 364 to 392, and again between 395 and 480. Although the administrative subdivisions varied, they generally involved a division of labour between East and West. Each division was a form of power-sharing (or even job-sharing), for the ultimate imperium was not divisible and therefore the empire remained legally one state—although the co-emperors often saw each other as rivals or enemies rather than partners.
 Western Roman Empire – In 285, Emperor Diocletian (r. 284–305) divided the Roman Empire's administration into western and eastern halves. In 293, Rome lost its capital status, and Milan became the capital.
 Byzantine Empire (Eastern Roman Empire) –  term used by modern historians to distinguish the Constantinople-centered Roman Empire of the Middle Ages from its earlier classical existence.
 Nicomedia – Nicomedia was the metropolis of Bithynia under the Roman Empire, and Diocletian made it the eastern capital city of the Roman Empire in 286 when he introduced the Tetrarchy system.
 Constantinople – founded in AD 330, at ancient Byzantium as the new capital of the entire Roman Empire by Constantine the Great, after whom it was named.
 Walls of Constantinople
 Fall of the Western Roman Empire (476 AD) – the two halves of the Roman Empire ended at different times, with the Western Roman Empire coming to an end in 476 AD (the end of Ancient Rome). The Eastern Roman Empire (referred to by historians as the Byzantine Empire) survived for nearly a thousand years more, and eventually engulfed much of the Western Roman Empire's former territory.
 Fall of the Western Roman Empire – this was not sudden, and took over a hundred years.  By 476, when Odoacer deposed the Emperor Romulus, the Western Roman Empire wielded negligible military, political, or financial power and had no effective control over the scattered Western domains that still described themselves as Roman.
 Odoacer – Germanic soldier, who in 476 became the first King of Italy (476-493). His reign is commonly seen as marking the end of the Western Roman Empire.
 Byzantine Empire (Byzantium) – after the Western Roman Empire fragmented and collapsed, the Eastern Roman Empire (Byzantium) continued to thrive, existing for nearly another thousand years until it fell to the Ottoman Turks in 1453. Its citizens referred to it as the Roman Empire, and saw it as a direct continuation of it. Historians consider it to be a distinctly different empire, with some overlap, but generally not included in the period referred to as Ancient Rome. Byzantium differed in major ways, including its primary language, which was Greek rather than Latin. It also differed religiously, with Roman mythology being replaced by Christianity.
 Legacy of the Roman Empire – what the Roman Empire passed on, in the form of cultural values, religious beliefs, as well as technological and other achievements, and through which it continued to shape other civilizations, a process which continues to this day.
 Cultural heritage of the Roman Empire
 Last of the Romans
 History of the Romans in Arabia
 Legacy of Byzantium
 Third Rome

Roman historiography 

Roman historiography
 Historiography of the fall of the Western Roman Empire
 Prosopography of ancient Rome

Works on Roman history 
 Ab urbe condita by Titus Livius (around 59 BC-17 AD), a monumental history of Rome, from its founding (traditionally dated to 753 BC).
 Annals and Histories by Tacitus
 De re militari by Vegetius
 Res Gestae by Ammianus MarcellinusThe History of the Decline and Fall of the Roman Empire by Edward Gibbon

 Culture of ancient Rome 

Culture of ancient Rome
 Architecture of ancient Rome 

Ancient Roman architecture
 Roman Architectural Revolution
Roman concrete
 Roman brick
Types of buildings and structures
 Roman amphitheatre
List of Roman amphitheatres
 Roman aqueduct
List of aqueducts in the city of Rome
List of aqueducts in the Roman Empire
 Roman bridge
 List of Roman bridges
 Roman canal
 Roman circus
 Roman cistern
 Roman dams and reservoirs
 Roman defensive walls
 Roman domes
 Forum
 Roman Forum
List of monuments of the Roman Forum
 Roman gardens
 Roman horreum
 Insula (building)
 Roman roads
 Roman roofs
 Roman temple
List of Ancient Roman temples
 Roman theatre
 List of Roman theatres
 Thermae
 List of Roman public baths
 Tholos
 Roman triumphal arches
 Roman villa
Villa rustica

 Art in ancient Rome 

Roman art
Art collection in ancient Rome
 Decorative arts of ancient Rome
Ancient Roman pottery
Roman glass
Roman mosaic
 Literature
 Augustan literature
 Augustan poetry
 Music of ancient Rome
 Painting of ancient Rome
 Pompeian Styles
 Sculpture of ancient Rome
Roman sculpture
Roman portraiture
 Theatre of ancient Rome
 Bathing in ancient Rome
 Calendar
Julian calendar
 Cuisine of ancient Rome
Food and dining in the Roman Empire
Baking in ancient Rome
 Wine in Roman culture
Alban wine
Caecuban wine
Falernian wine
 Education in ancient Rome
Athenaeum
Paedagogus
 Fashion in ancient Rome
 Clothing in ancient Rome
Abolla
Palla
Pallium
Stola
Synthesis
Toga
Angusticlavia
Trabea
 Cosmetics in Ancient Rome
 Roman hairstyles
Caesar cut
 Roman jewelry
 Festivals
 Ludi Romani
 Lupercalia
 Saturnalia
 Fiction set in ancient Rome
 Roman folklore
 Roman jokes
 Legacy of the Roman Empire
Museum of Roman Civilization
 Medicine in ancient Rome
 Dentistry in ancient Rome
 Disability in ancient Rome
 Disease in Imperial Rome
 Food and diet in ancient medicine
 Gynecology in ancient Rome 
 Medical community of ancient Rome
 Mental illness in ancient Rome
 Surgery in ancient Rome
 Naming conventions
 People in ancient Rome
List of ancient Romans
 Philosophy in ancient Rome
 Public entertainment
 Chariot racing
 Gladiator combat
 Ludi Sexuality in ancient Rome
 Homosexuality in ancient Rome
 Prostitution
 Technology
 Engineering in ancient Rome
 Units of measurement
Roman timekeeping
 Sanitation in ancient Rome

 Social order in ancient Rome 

 Associations in Ancient Rome
Collegium
 Dignitas Family in ancient Rome
 Pater familias
 Adoption in ancient Rome
 Birth registration in ancient Rome
 Childhood in ancient Rome
 Marriage in ancient Rome
 Confarreatio
 Diffarreation
 Manus marriage
 Weddings in ancient Rome
 Mos maiorum''
 Patronage in ancient Rome
 Roman citizenship
 Romanization
 Slavery in ancient Rome
 Social class in ancient Rome
 Patricians
 Equites
 Plebs
Conflict of the Orders
Secessio plebis
 Equestrian order
 Gens
 Tribes
 Poverty in ancient Rome
 Women in ancient Rome
 Naming conventions for women in ancient Rome

Religion in ancient Rome 

Religion in ancient Rome
 Imperial cult
 Persecution of pagans in the late Roman Empire
 Religious persecution in the Roman Empire

Roman mythology 

Roman mythology
 Roman Gods
 Capitoline Triad
Juno
Jupiter
Minerva
 Heroes
 Hercules in ancient Rome
 Great Altar of Hercules
 Temple of Hercules Victor
 Roma (deity)

Roman religious institutions 

 Collegium Pontificum
 Vestal Virgin
 Rex Sacrorum
 Pontifex maximus
 Flamen
 Augur
 Quindecimviri sacris faciundis
 Epulones

Roman religious practices 
 Animal sacrifice 
 Lustratio
October Horse
Taurobolium
 Roman funerary practices
Roman funerary art
Roman sarcophagi

Language in ancient Rome 

Latin
 Romance languages
 History of Latin
 Old Latin
 Classical Latin
 Vulgar Latin
 Latin alphabet
Latin letters used in mathematics
 Roman numerals
 Latin phrases
 Latin-script calligraphy
Roman cursive
Roman square capitals
Rustic capitals
Languages of the Roman Empire

Economy of ancient Rome 
 

Roman economy
 Roman agriculture
 Deforestation
 Grain supply to the city of Rome
 Roman commerce
Roman trade with China
Roman trade with India
 Roman finance
 Banking in ancient Rome
 Taxation in ancient Rome
 Roman currency
 Roman Republican currency
 Roman provincial currency
 Roman metallurgy
 Mining in ancient Rome
Mining in Roman Britain

Scholars

Ancient

 Apuleius
 Catullus
 Cicero
 Curtius
 Horace
 Julius Caesar
 Juvenal
 Livy
 Lucretius
 Ovid
 Petronius
 Plautus
 Pliny the Elder
 Pliny the Younger
 Propertius
 Sallust
 Seneca the Elder
 Seneca the Younger
 Suetonius
 Tacitus
 Varro
 Virgil
 Vitruvius

Modern
 Edward Gibbon

Ancient Roman lists 

 Adjectival and demonymic forms of regions in Greco-Roman antiquity
 Alphabetized list of notable ancient Romans
 Glossary of ancient Roman religion
 Ancient monuments in Rome
 Ancient Roman fasti
 Ancient Roman temples
 Ancient Romans
 Aqueducts in the city of Rome
 Aqueducts in the Roman Empire
 Censors of the Roman Republic
 Cities founded by the Romans
 Civil wars and revolts
 Condemned Roman emperors
 Governors of Roman Britain
 Late Roman provinces
 Monuments of the Roman Forum
 Roman amphitheatres
 Roman aqueducts by date
 Roman army unit types
 Roman auxiliary regiments
 Roman basilicas
 Roman bridges
 Roman canals
 Roman cisterns
 Roman consuls
 Roman dams and reservoirs
 Roman deities
 Roman dictators
 Roman dynasties
 Roman domes
 Roman emperors
 Roman generals
 Roman gentes
 Roman imperial victory titles
 Roman laws
 Roman legions
 Roman moneyers during the Republic
 Roman praetors
 Roman public baths
 Roman taxes
 Roman theatres
 Roman tribunes
 Roman triumphal arches
 Roman usurpers
 Roman wars and battles
 Thirty Tyrants

See also 

 Outline of Rome
 Outline of classical studies
 Daqin
 Fiction set in ancient Rome

References

External links 

 Ancient Rome resources for students from the Courtenay Middle School Library.
 History of Ancient Rome OpenCourseWare from the University of Notre Dame providing free resources including lectures, discussion questions, assignments and exams.
 Ancient Rome portal at Encarta Encyclopedia
 Gallery of the Ancient Art: Ancient Rome
 Lacus Curtius
 Livius.Org 
 Nova Roma - Educational Organization about "All Things Roman"
 The Private Life of the Romans by Harold Whetstone Johnston
 United Nations of Roma Victrix (UNRV) History
 Water and Wastewater Systems in Imperial Rome
 Ancient Rome at The History Channel

 
Outlines of geography and places
Wikipedia outlines